Dogue Creek is an  tributary of the Potomac River in Fairfax County, Virginia, named for the Tauxenent Indigenous Native American People also known as Doeg people. The lower  of the creek form a tidal embayment of the Potomac to the east of Fort Belvoir.

Variant names
The Board on Geographic Names decided upon Dogue Creek as the stream's official name in 1892. Previously, it had been known by the following names according to the Geographic Names Information System:

 Doag Creek
 Doeg Creek
 Dog's Creek
 Dogue Run
 Epsewassen Creek
 Epsewasson
 Epsewasson Creek
 Hopkins Creek
 Hopkins' Creek

See also
List of rivers of Virginia

References

Rivers of Fairfax County, Virginia
Rivers of Virginia
Tributaries of the Potomac River